Grigorios Georgakopoulos (1909 – 1956) was a Greek middle-distance runner. He competed in the men's 800 metres at the 1936 Summer Olympics.

References

1909 births
1956 deaths
Athletes (track and field) at the 1936 Summer Olympics
Greek male middle-distance runners
Olympic athletes of Greece
Place of birth missing
Athletes from Athens